Silent Chaos Serpentine is the second studio album by Sri Lanka-based heavy metal band, Stigmata.  The album was released in January 2006.
The Album Current was on Australian metal site www.themetalforge.com's top 50 reviews of all time for over a year and was positioned at no.9.
The Album was also nominated for an Album of the Year on the site tmetal.com

Track listing 
 "Swinemaker" – 4:31
 "Forgiven, Forgotten" – 5:51
 "Jazz Theory" – 6:38
 "Lucid" – 5:09
 "My Malice" – 3:39
 "Wingless" – 5:18
 "Solitude" – 5:32
 "Book of Skin" – 6:28

Album Line up 
Suresh De Silva
Andrew Obeysekara
Tennyson Napoleon
Wije Dhas
Ranil Senarath

References

External links
Encyclopaedia Metallum

2006 albums
Stigmata (band) albums